Chloé Herry (born 12 August 1992), known professionally as CloZee, is a French musician, DJ, and record producer.

Early life and education 
Chloé was born in Paris, France. At age 11 her family moved to Toulouse, France when her father took a job with Airbus. She developed an interest in the classical guitar and her parents enrolled her in classical-guitar lessons. After high school she signed up for a two-year audio-engineering program and discovered the music software FL Studio. She started to post and share her sounds on the internet.

Discography

Albums
 Evasion (2018)
 Neon Jungle (2020)

References

External links 
 

1992 births
Living people
French DJs
French electronic musicians
French women in electronic music
Future bass musicians
Electronic dance music DJs